Þórdís "Disa" Lilja Gísladóttir (born 5 March 1961) is an Icelandic athlete. She competed in the women's high jump at the 1976 Summer Olympics and the 1984 Summer Olympics. She was a member of the track and field team at the University of Alabama in Tuscaloosa.

References

1961 births
Living people
Athletes (track and field) at the 1976 Summer Olympics
Athletes (track and field) at the 1984 Summer Olympics
Disa Gisladottir
Disa Gisladottir
Place of birth missing (living people)
Alabama Crimson Tide women's track and field athletes